McCallion is a surname. Notable people with the surname include:

Eddie McCallion (born 1979), Northern Irish footballer
Elisha McCallion (born 1982), Northern Irish politician
Enda McCallion (born 1967), Irish film director
Hazel McCallion (1921–2023), Canadian mayor
Mac McCallion (1950–2018), New Zealand rugby union coach
Marcus McCallion (born 1971), English graphic designer and typographer
Seamus McCallion, (born 1964), Irish rugby league player